Pamela Sue Evette (née Gajoch; born August 28, 1967) is an American politician and businesswoman and the 93rd lieutenant governor of South Carolina since 2019. A member of the Republican Party, she was the CEO of Quality Business Solutions in Upstate South Carolina before her election as lieutenant governor. She is the first lieutenant governor to be elected on the same ticket as the governor. She has been in office since January 9, 2019, when Henry McMaster began his first elected term as governor.

Background
Evette is the granddaughter of Polish immigrants. Born in Ohio, Evette earned her Bachelor of Business Administration (B.B.A.) in accounting from Cleveland State University. Evette worked as an accountant until returning to Travelers Rest, South Carolina in 2005, where she founded and acted as CEO of Quality Business Solutions, a payroll, HR and back-office solutions software firm.

Evette was the first lieutenant governor elected on the same ticket as the governor. Before the 2018 election, South Carolina lieutenant governors were elected independently of the governor. She defeated Mandy Powers Norrell in the gubernatorial election on November 6, 2018. Evette took office as South Carolina's second female lieutenant governor (the first being Nancy Stevenson from 1979 through 1983 under Richard Riley) on January 9, 2019.

Behind Nancy Stevenson, Evette is the second woman to hold the role of lieutenant governor, and first Republican woman to hold the office.

Lieutenant Governor

As lieutenant governor, a largely ceremonial role in South Carolina, Evette has spent much of her time giving speeches and addresses that support Governor Henry McMaster. Evette said in an interview with the Associated Press that she has "doubled the potential footprint" of the governor's office through hosting various events across the state and communicating with lawmakers.

Evette is South Carolina's first lieutenant governor elected on the same ticket as the governor. Her predecessor, Kevin L. Bryant, was a political enemy of Governor McMaster, and the two consequentially did not have the same political agenda. 

In October 2019, Evette was involved in a car collision in Greer, South Carolina when her driver inappropriately activated his flashing blue and red lights to go through an intersection. Evette's driver was cited, and Evette was uninjured.

In November 2022, McMaster and Evette won reelection.

Awards and honors
In 2015, Evette was ranked the #3 top female entrepreneurs in the United States by Inc. Magazine, noting that as CEO, she grew her business to a one-billion-dollar enterprise in the 15 years since its inception.

Electoral history

Personal life
Evette is married to David Evette, with whom she has one son. She also has one son and one daughter from a previous marriage.

External Links 
Appearances on C-Span

References

1967 births
21st-century American politicians
21st-century American women politicians
Businesspeople from South Carolina
Cleveland State University alumni
Lieutenant Governors of South Carolina
Living people
People from Travelers Rest, South Carolina
South Carolina Republicans
Women in South Carolina politics